Javier Ruiz (born August 18, 1973) was the Chief Editor at Cadena SER, and host of the business show "Hora 25 de los Negocios".

He was fired in 2011 after Cuatro was purchased by Telecinco. He now works as a freelance journalist for VozPopuli and Telecinco.

References

Living people
1973 births